The Tibetan Dog is a 2011 Chinese/Japanese animated film directed by Masayuki Kojima, co-produced by Madhouse, China Film Group Corporation and Ciwen Pictures. It is based on the novel Mastiffs of the Plateau by Yang Zhijun. It premiered at 51st Annecy Film Festival in June 2011. Manga artist Naoki Urasawa provided the initial character designs, before they were reworked by Shigeru Fujita. In this film, a young boy named Tenzing leaves for Tibet after his mother passes away to live with his father in the prairies and encounters a true friend in form of a golden Tibetan Mastiff. Maiden Japan released the film on home video in the U.S.

References

External links
  
 

2011 animated films
2011 films
2011 anime films
Chinese animated films
Films about Tibet
Films directed by Masayuki Kojima
Japanese animated films
Madhouse (company)
Maiden Japan
Tibetan-language films
Naoki Urasawa